Coulombiers may refer to the following places in France:

 Coulombiers, Sarthe, a commune in the Sarthe department
 Coulombiers, Vienne, a commune in the Vienne department